The Christian C. Sanderson Museum, or simply Sanderson Museum, is a museum of historical artifacts in Chadds Ford, Pennsylvania, United States. It is located in the Chadds Ford Historic District.  The items in the museum were collected over many years by Christian C. Sanderson (1882–1966), a teacher, musician, poet, actor, writer, traveler, radio commentator and local historian. The Sanderson Museum was founded in 1967 by his friend and Brandywine artist Andrew Wyeth.

The museum contains part of the bandage put on Abraham Lincoln after he was assassinated. The museum also houses the pocket book Jennie Wade was carrying when she was killed at the battle of Gettysburg, and a number of autographs including those of Sitting Bull, Shirley Temple, Helen Keller and Basil Rathbone. The Sanderson's archives contain close to 80 letters to Sanderson from Civil War veterans.

As Mr. Sanderson was a great friend of the Wyeth family, the museum has a number of works from N.C., Andrew and Jamie on display.

In April, 2007 the board observed the museum's 40th anniversary with the dedication of a bronze plaque to the five founding members. Andrew Wyeth and Thomas Thompson, the two surviving founders, were present for the ceremony. 

A banquet was held on October 14, 2007 to celebrate the museum's 40th Anniversary. In September 2008 the museum was filmed as part of a British documentary on U.S. Route 1. 

The museum is located at 1755 Creek Road (Old Route 100), Chadds Ford, PA 19317

See also
 Brandywine River Museum of Art

External links

Wyeth family
Andrew Wyeth
Sanderson Museum
Sanderson Museum
Sanderson
Art museums and galleries in Pennsylvania
Brandywine Museums & Gardens Alliance
Museums established in 1967
1967 establishments in Pennsylvania
Museums of American art
Chadds Ford Township, Delaware County, Pennsylvania